Farringdon may refer to:

People
 Nicholas de Farndone, 14th century Mayor of London

Places

London
 Farringdon, London, an area of Clerkenwell which takes its name from Farringdon Station. 
 Farringdon Road, a road in Clerkenwell, London
 Farringdon Street, an extension of Farringdon Road into the City of London
 Farringdon station, a railway station in Clerkenwell
 Farringdon Within, a ward in the City of London  
 Farringdon Without, a ward in the City of London

Other parts of the UK
Farringdon, Devon
Farringdon, Hampshire
Farringdon, Sunderland
Farringdon Community Sports College, a school in Farringdon, Sunderland

Outside the UK
Farringdon, New South Wales, a locality in Australia

See also
 Faringdon, Oxfordshire, England
 Faringdon, New Zealand, suburb of Rolleston, Canterbury, New Zealand
 Farington (disambiguation)
 Farrington (disambiguation)